The 2000 California State Senate elections were held on November 7, 2000. Senate seats of odd-numbered districts were up for election. Senate terms are staggered so that half the membership is elected every two years. Senators serve four-year terms and are limited to two terms. The Democratic Party held on to the majority of the seats, gaining one seat in the process.

Overview

Results
Final results from the California Secretary of State:

District 1

District 3

District 5

District 7

District 9

District 11

District 13

District 15

District 17

District 19

District 21

District 23

District 25

District 27

District 29

District 31

District 33

District 35

District 37

District 39

See also
California State Assembly
California State Assembly elections, 2000
California state elections, 2000
California State Legislature
California State Senate Districts
Districts in California
Political party strength in U.S. states
Political party strength in California

References

Senate
California Senate
2000